The Silver Party was a political party in the United States active from 1892 until 1911 and most successful in Nevada which supported a platform of bimetallism and free silver.

In 1892, several Silver Party candidates were elected to Nevada public offices. The party's success continued throughout the decade, culminating in the election of Governors John E. Jones and Reinhold Sadler. Nevada was the only state to elect both Senators and Congressional representatives from the Silver Party.

Nationally, the Silver Party aligned with the Populist Party and to a lesser extent with the Silver Republican Party. By 1902, most pro-silver factions in Nevada had been absorbed by the state Democratic Party organization.

Notable members 
 William M. Stewart – Senator from Nevada
 John P. Jones – Senator from Nevada
 John E. Jones – Governor of Nevada (1895–1896)
 Reinhold Sadler – Lieutenant Governor of Nevada (1895–1896) and Governor of Nevada (1896–1903)
 John Sparks  – Governor of Nevada (1903–1908)
 Denver S. Dickerson – Lieutenant Governor of Nevada (1907–1908) and Governor of Nevada (1908–1911)
 John Gregovich – member of the Nevada Senate (1894–1898)
 James Yancy Callahan – congressional delegate from the Oklahoma Territory

See also 
 Silver Republican Party
 Silver-Democrats

References 
 Specific

 General
 Political History of Nevada

Regional and state political parties in the United States
Defunct political parties in the United States
Political parties established in 1892
Silver
Progressive Era in the United States
Political parties in the United States